International Hero may refer to:

 Action Force (video game), also known as Action Force: International Hero
 International (film), a 2015 action film